A front vowel is a class of vowel sounds used in some spoken languages, its defining characteristic being that the highest point of the tongue is positioned as far forward as possible in the mouth without creating a constriction that would otherwise make it a consonant. Front vowels are sometimes also called bright vowels because they are perceived as sounding brighter than the back vowels.

Near-front vowels are essentially a type of front vowel; no language is known to contrast front and near-front vowels based on backness alone.

Rounded front vowels are typically centralized, that is, near-front in their articulation. This is one reason they are written to the right of unrounded front vowels in the IPA vowel chart.

Partial list
The front vowels that have dedicated symbols in the International Phonetic Alphabet are:

 close front unrounded vowel 
 close front compressed vowel 
 near-close front unrounded vowel 
 near-close front compressed vowel 
 close-mid front unrounded vowel 
 close-mid front compressed vowel 
 open-mid front unrounded vowel 
 open-mid front compressed vowel 
 near-open front unrounded vowel 
 open front unrounded vowel 
 open front rounded vowel 

There also are front vowels without dedicated symbols in the IPA:

 close front protruded vowel 
 near-close front protruded vowel 
 close-mid front protruded vowel 
 mid front unrounded vowel  or 
 mid front compressed vowel  or 
 mid front protruded vowel  or 
 open-mid front protruded vowel 

Articulatorily fronted vowels

In articulation, fronted vowels, where the tongue moves forward from its resting position, contrast with raised vowels and retracted vowels. Within the fronted vowels, vowel height (open or close) is determined by the position of the jaw, not by the tongue directly. Phonemic raised and retracted vowels may be phonetically fronted by certain consonants, such as palatals and in some languages pharyngeals.

Effect on preceding consonant

In the history of many languages, for example French and Japanese, front vowels have altered preceding velar or alveolar consonants, bringing their place of articulation towards palatal or postalveolar. This change can be allophonic variation, or it can have become phonemic.

English follows the French pattern, but without as much regularity.

See also
Central vowel
Back vowel
List of phonetics topics
Relative articulation

References

Vowels by backness
Phonology